Massachusetts Avenue may refer to:
 Massachusetts Avenue (metropolitan Boston), Massachusetts
 Massachusetts Avenue (MBTA Orange Line station), a subway station on the MBTA Orange Line
 Massachusetts Avenue (MBTA Silver Line station), a station on the MBTA Silver Line Washington Street route
 "Massachusetts Avenue", a song by Amanda Palmer & the Grand Theft Orchestra from the 2012 album Theatre Is Evil
 Massachusetts Avenue (Halifax, NS)
 Massachusetts Avenue, Indianapolis, Indiana
 Massachusetts Avenue (San Diego Trolley station), a station on the San Diego Metropolitan Transit System
 Massachusetts Avenue (Washington, D.C.), the longest of the state named streets in Washington, D.C.
 Massachusetts Avenue Historic District (Washington, D.C.)
 Embassy Row
 Massachusetts Avenue Historic District (Worcester, Massachusetts)
 Massachusetts Avenue, a street in the game Monopoly

See also

 Massachusetts (disambiguation)
 Massachusetts Street, Lawrence, Kansas